Garrya ovata, with the common names eggleaf silktassel, Mexican silktassel, and eggleaf garrya, is a plant species native to New Mexico, Texas, and to central and northern Mexico.

The plant is usually found as an understory species in moist forests, such as Madrean pine-oak woodlands.

Description

Flowers are arranged in pendulous (hanging) racemes, and are green. It blooms in March through May.

Subspecies
Three subspecies are currently recognized, regarded by some authors as separate species:
Garrya ovata subsp. ovata
Garrya ovata subsp. goldmanii — (Wooton & Standl.) Dahling
Garrya ovata subsp. lindheimeri — (Torr.) Dahling

Of the three, only Garrya ovata subsp. ''lindheimeri' is found within the United States.

See also
Madrean Sky Islands
Madrean pine-oak woodlands
Sierra Madre Occidental pine-oak forests
Sierra Madre Oriental pine-oak forests
Trans-Mexican Volcanic Belt pine-oak forests

References

External links
USDA Plants Profile for Garrya ovata (eggleaf silktassel)
Lady Bird Johnson Wildflower Center Native Plant Information Network: Garrya ovata

Garryales
Flora of Mexico
Flora of New Mexico
Flora of Central Mexico
Flora of Northeastern Mexico
Flora of Chihuahua (state)
Flora of Texas
Flora of the Sierra Madre Occidental
Flora of the Sierra Madre Oriental